The Bishop's Palace of Paignton, the remnants of which stand beside the parish church of St John the Baptist, comprise the remains of the residence of the bishops of Exeter in the town. The site is defined as a scheduled monument by Historic England, with the standing medieval walls and the C14th Century corner tower, sometimes called Coverdale's Tower, being Listed Grade II*. Within the walls are the fragmentary remnants of the palace chapel (Listed Grade II) along with a Grade II Listed vicarage of the 20th Century.

References 

Scheduled monuments in Devon
Grade II* listed buildings in Devon
Buildings and structures in Paignton